Brian Sandy (born 24 November 1932) is a former British cyclist. He competed in the team pursuit at the 1964 Summer Olympics.

References

1932 births
Living people
British male cyclists
Olympic cyclists of Great Britain
Cyclists at the 1964 Summer Olympics